Srirangam Srimadh Andavan Ashramam has been an institution for more than three centuries in nurturing and furthering Acharya Ramanuja's
and Swami Vedanta Desika's doctrine of Vishishtadvaita. The institution traces its roots to Swami Vedantha Desika through Saakshaath Swami and to Acharya Ramanuja through Kidambi Aachaan and Kurathazwan. The head of the institution is known as "Andavan" or "Andavan Swamigal", a name that is believed to be given by Lord Ranganatha himself to the first seer.

Srirangam Srimadh Andavan Ashramam is among the organizations that follow Sri Vedanta Desika as the torch bearer of Sri Ramanuja's teachings. The others are Sri Parakala Matam, Ahobila Mutt and Sri Poundarikapuram Andavan Ashramam.

The main activities of the institution include conducting sacraments of Samashrayanam and Bharanyasam, Kalakshepams (higher spiritual lessons), Vedic and Western education through Patashalas and secular Colleges, managing and funding various temples and Divya Deshams, spreading Ramanuja siddhantham through its various centers.

Following 
Many Vadakalais who belong to the Munitraya sampradaya group are followers of Srimadh Andavan Ashramam. The institution is referred to as just "Ashramam" or "Andavan Ashram" or "Periashramam" by various people.

Centers / Physical Locations
The headquarters of the Ashramam (hermitage) is in Srirangam where most Acharyas of this lineage have spent most of their saintly lives. The institution has centers spread across India and the US. Most centers have temples and/or Patashalas. Some famous cities which contain what is called as "Andavan Ashramam" are Mumbai, New Delhi, Bangalore (2 centers), Calcutta, Chennai, Brindavan, Badrinath, Hyderabad (2 centers), Aurangabad, and Tirupati. The institution also runs an Arts and Science college in Srirangam.

Worship
The main symbol of worship and the central theme of the institution's philosophical approach is Lord Ranganatha's Padukas (divine sandals). The primordial deity of this Ashramam is Lord Venugopala swamy (Lord Krishna).

The Current Pontiff
The current pontiff is Sri Varaha Mahadesikan (Andavan), a scholar (with traditional doctoral-equivalents) in Nyaya (roughly translates to Absolute Righteousness) and Tarka (Logic) and Vishishtadvaita Vedhantha. The official website of this Ashramam is http://www.andavan.org . http://www.ramanujamission.org is the official website of the American branch of this institution.
Mahadesikan initiated efforts to spread this message of Srivaishnavism and Prapathi margam founded and propagated by Sri Bhagavath Ramanuja and nurtured by Sri Nigamantha Mahadesika several centuries ago and performed samasrayanam and saranagathi to thousands of sishyas. He offered Mangalasasanams to the Divya Dampathis of most of the 108 Divya Desams, imparted Grantha Chathustya Kalakshepams and Anugraha Bhashanams to countless audiences.

See also

 Sri Vaishnavism
 Ramanuja
 Vedanta Desika
 Ahobila Mutt
 Parakala Mutt

External links
 http://www.ramanujamission.org/general1.php?id1=9&id2=0 - Lineage source: Sri Ramanuja Mission's Web Site
 http://www.pbase.com/svami/periyaashramam - Pictures of deities
  Srimad - A sample story from The Hindu - 13 December 2002

Ashrams
Hindu organizations
Sri Vaishnavism